Traginops is a genus of flies in the family Odiniidae. There are about seven described species in Traginops.

Species
These seven species belong to the genus Traginops:
 Traginops irroratus Coquillett, 1900
 Traginops moremii Cogan, 1975
 Traginops naganensis Kato, 1952
 Traginops orientalis Meijere, 1911
 Traginops purpurops Steyskal, 1963
 Traginops ruwenzoricus Cogan, 1975
 Traginops shewelli Cogan, 1975

References

Further reading

External links

 

Odiniidae
Articles created by Qbugbot